The 1971 Pan American Games were held in Cali, Colombia, from July 30 to August 13, 1971. (One source dates the Games from July 25 to August 8.) A total of 2,935 athletes from 32 countries participated in seventeen sports. (One source says 4,000 athletes)

Host city selection

Three cities submitted bids to host the 1971 Pan American Games that were recognized by the Pan American Sports Organization. On July 22, 1967, Cali was selected over Santiago and Champ, Missouri by a vote of 12 to 11 to 6, respectively, by PASO at its general assembly, held at the Manitoba Medical College in Winnipeg, Canada, to host the VI Pan American Games.

Participating nations

Sports

Venues
The main stadium was the Cali Olympic Stadium. Some events were held in the Coliseo El Pueblo. Boxing was staged in the Plaza de Toros Cañaveralejo, a Cali bullring. Some complaints were made about the barracks-style housing, which was woefully overcrowded. In an effort to protect the athletes from students who had protested the amount of money that Colombia was spending on the games, security-minded officials surrounded the athletes' village with barbed wire and guards carrying rifles.  The overcrowding caused it to be dubbed "Claustrophobia Manor" by the athletes. Other concerns centered on mosquitoes, the altitude, faulty plumbing, dysentery and pickpockets.

Medal count 

To sort this table by nation, total medal count, or any other column, click on the  icon next to the column title.

Note
 The medal counts for the United States, Cuba and Canada are disputed.

References

External links
 Cali 1971 - VI Pan American Games - Official Report at PanamSports.org 

 
Pan American Games
Pan
Pan
Pan
Pan
Pan
Multi-sport events in Colombia
Sport in Cali
Pan American Games
Pan American Games